Quinby may refer to:

Places
Quinby, Virginia
Quinby, Kansas
Quinby, South Carolina
Ivory Quinby House, Illinois
Quinby Plantation, South Carolina

People
 Ivory Quinby (1817–1869), Mayor of Monmouth, Illinois, founding father of Monmouth College
 Henry B. Quinby (1846–1924), 52nd Governor of New Hampshire
 Moses Quinby (1810–1875), early American beekeeper
 Moses Quinby (1786–1857), lawyer and subject of a well-known John Brewster, Jr. portrait
 Isaac Ferdinand Quinby (1821–1891), American Civil War General
 William Quinby De Funiak or William Q De Funiak (1901–1981), American writer and academic
 Byron Quinby Jones (1888–1959), pioneer aviator and U.S. Army officer
 John Alonzo Quinby (c. 1819-?), 13th Mayor of San Jose, California
 James Moses Quinby (1804–1874), American businessman, 10th Mayor of Newark, New Jersey
 Charles Quinby (1899–1988), U.S. Olympic swimmer
 Ephraim Quinby (1766–1850), founder of Warren, Ohio
 William E. Quinby (1835–1908), newspaper publisher and U.S. Ambassador to the Netherlands
 Edwin J. Quinby (1895–1981), publicist, inventor, historian, and activist
 James M. Quinby (1804–1874), Mayor of Newark, New Jersey, 1851–1854

Companies
J.M. Quinby & Co., early automobile and carriage manufacturer
Vega Company, originally named Quinby & Hall

See also
Quimby (disambiguation)
Quinby (automobile)